Prince Charles Alexander Emanuel of Lorraine (12 December 1712 in Lunéville – 4 July 1780 in Tervuren) was a Lorraine-born Austrian general and soldier, field marshal of the Imperial Army, and governor of the Austrian Netherlands.

Early life

Charles was the son of Leopold, Duke of Lorraine, and Élisabeth Charlotte d'Orléans. When his elder brother Francis III, Duke of Lorraine, married the Archduchess Maria Theresa, daughter of Emperor Charles VI, Charles Alexander entered the Imperial service in 1737.

When his brother Francis traded the duchy to the ex-Polish king Stanisław Leszczyński in exchange for the Grand Duchy of Tuscany as one of the terms ending the War of the Polish Succession in November 1738, the ducal title to Lorraine and Bar passed beyond Charles to King Louis XV of France upon Leszczynski's death in 1766, though Francis and his successors retained the right to style themselves as dukes of Lorraine and Bar. 

On 7 January 1744 he married Maria Theresa's only sister, Archduchess Maria Anna of Austria, thus making him doubly Maria Theresa's brother-in-law. The couple were jointly made Governors of the Austrian Netherlands.

Although Maria Anna died later the same year after marriage, Charles' popularity and lack of clear replacement allowed him to continue as governor and de facto sovereign until his own death in 1780. Charles also became Grand Master of the Teutonic Order in 1761.

During the War of the Austrian Succession, he was one of the principal Austrian military commanders.  He was most notable for his defeats by better trained and superior forces under Frederick the Great. At the Battle of Chotusitz in 1742, his forces lost the battle but were able to inflict greater loss of life and retreat in good order. However, he lost more decisively to Frederick at the Battle of Hohenfriedberg and the Battle of Soor in 1745. He was also defeated by Maurice de Saxe at the Battle of Rocoux in 1746.

Seven Years' War

Despite his record of defeats, he was able to retain his position. He was able to attain command ahead of the more popular Marshal Browne because of the support of his brother who had significant influence over military appointments. During Austria's Third Silesian War against Prussia (part of the wider Seven Years' War), he commanded the army of the Roman-German Emperor at the Battle of Prague, where he was again defeated by Frederick the Great, king of Prussia, but was able to inflict heavy casualties on the larger Prussian forces. He subsequently defeated a much smaller Prussian army in 1757 at the Battle of Breslau before being completely routed by Frederick the Great at the Battle of Leuthen, which is considered one of Frederick's most brilliant victories. During the battle, he was commander of the Imperial Army as appointed by Maria Theresa.

At Leuthen, the Austrians were overwhelmingly defeated by an army half their size, with fewer guns, and tired after a long march over 12 days. Charles and his second in command, Count Leopold Joseph von Daun , sank "in the depths of despondency", and the Prince could not fathom what had happened. Charles had a mixed record against Frederick in past encounters but had never fared so badly as at Leuthen. After this crushing defeat, Maria Theresa replaced him with Daun; Charles retired from military service and subsequently served as the governor of the Austrian Netherlands.   Though an unsuccessful military leader, Charles proved to be a competent administrator, well-liked by the population. Under him, the Austrian Netherlands flourished, and he was deeply involved in the cultural life of his province.

Family and private life
Because Charles ruled by right of his marriage to Maria Anna of Austria, Maria Anna's death very shortly after marriage created a situation on which his mistress Elisabeth de Vaux and his children, were kept under strict privacy and not made public. Indeed, his children were to present themselves only under the surnames of their mothers in public if they were in the Netherlands.

Though there is obscurity about his private affairs after the death of Maria Anna, it is known that from his mistress Elisabeth de Vaux, Charles had a son, Charles Alexandre Guillaume Joseph, and a grandson through the same; a stillborn daughter by an unnamed mistress; a son, Charles Frédéric, by an unnamed mistress; a son, Jean Nicholas, and a daughter, Anne Françoise, by an unnamed mistress. With his mistress Regina Elisabeth Bartholotti von Porthenfeld (b.1725) he had a daughter Maria Regina Johanna von Merey, later Baroness von Hackelberg-Landau (1744-1779). Some of his children were known to have lived in Dutch-speaking parts of Belgium temporarily or permanently, including his first son Charles Alexandre Guillaume Joseph, who was later known to have returned to Lunéville in Lorraine, to have claimed a substantially bountiful inheritance, to have had a son Gustav Auguste in 1788, and to have died in Nancy.

Ancestry

References

1712 births
1780 deaths
People from Lunéville
Military personnel of the Austrian Netherlands
18th-century French people
Austrian military personnel of the War of the Austrian Succession
Austrian military personnel of the Seven Years' War
Burials at the Cathedral of St. Michael and St. Gudula
Governors of the Habsburg Netherlands
Grand Masters of the Teutonic Order
Nobility of the Austrian Netherlands
Knights of the Golden Fleece of Austria
Princes of Lorraine
Generals of the Holy Roman Empire
People of the Silesian Wars
Grand Crosses of the Military Order of Maria Theresa
Politicians of the Austrian Netherlands